Showbiz Ka! was a showbiz talk show aired on Radio Philippines Network from March 5 to June 1, 2007.

Host
Pat-P Daza

See also
List of programs previously broadcast by Radio Philippines Network

Philippine television talk shows
Radio Philippines Network original programming
2007 Philippine television series debuts
2007 Philippine television series endings